Bill Williams (22 June 1929 – 10 August 2009) was  a former Australian rules footballer who played with Richmond in the Victorian Football League (VFL). He won the Stawell Gift in 1956.

Notes

External links 
		

1929 births
2009 deaths
Australian rules footballers from Victoria (Australia)
Richmond Football Club players
Spotswood Football Club players
Stawell Gift winners